The 2001 Men's World Team Squash Championships took place between October 22 and October 28 in Australia.

Seeds

Results

Pool A

Pool B

Pool C

Pool D

Pool E

Pool F

Second round

Quarter-finals

Semi-finals

Third Place Play Off

Final

See also 
World Team Squash Championships
World Squash Federation
World Open (squash)

References 

World Squash Championships
Squash tournaments in Australia
International sports competitions hosted by Australia
Squash
Men